Denmark competed at the 2013 World Aquatics Championships in Barcelona, Spain between 19 July to 4 August 2013.

Medalists

Swimming

Jeanette Ottesen got the Danes' sole gold at the championships in the 50 m butterfly, while Rikke Møller Pedersen set a new world record in the 200 m breaststroke, the first Danish long course world record in 61 years, in the semi-final with 2:19.11. She went on to win silver in the final, her first medal at the World Aquatics Championships.
In addition, Lotte Friis set a new European record in the 1500 m freestyle. She would go on to win silver in both the 800 and 1500 m freestyle events.

In total, seven Danish records were broken during the championships, and three new Nordic records were set, by Møller Pedersen (100 m and 200 m breaststroke; she beat the former distance's record twice) and Friis (1500 m freestyle).

Danish swimmers earned qualifying standards in the following events (up to a maximum of 2 swimmers in each event at the A-standard entry time, and 1 at the B-standard):

Women

References

External links
BCN 2013 website

Nations at the 2013 World Aquatics Championships
2013 in Danish sport
Denmark at the World Aquatics Championships